Paolo Zavallone (born in Riccione on August 29, 1932) is an Italian singer and composer, most known as El Pasador.

Biography 
In 1977 he recorded the song Amada Mia, Amore Mio, peaked #25 in Italian Singles Chart and #66 in Swiss Singles Chart. and #10 in German Singles Chart https://www.offiziellecharts.de/titel-details-51781

Discography

Singles

Studio albums

References

1932 births
Italian composers
Italian male composers
Italian singer-songwriters
People from the Province of Rimini
Living people